Woodbridge is a census-designated place (CDP) in Prince William County, Virginia, United States, located  south of Washington, D.C. Bounded by the Occoquan and Potomac rivers, Woodbridge had 44,668 residents at the 2020 census.  

Woodbridge offers a variety of amenities for residents and visitors, including Potomac Mills shopping mall and Stonebridge at Potomac Town Center. Woodbridge is served by the Prince William County Public Schools, and the Woodbridge campus of Northern Virginia Community College borders the district. Sentara Northern Virginia Medical Center, a non-profit hospital, formerly Potomac Hospital, recently expanded and now has the capacity to serve 183 patients. Transportation includes access to Interstate 95, two VRE commuter train stations, bus service, and a local "slugging" system, offering residents a variety of transit options.

Woodbridge offers a wide range of recreational opportunities for resident and visitors. The Occoquan Bay National Wildlife Refuge is a natural habitat for a variety of plant and animal life including the bald eagles and ospreys.  Veteran's Park and Leesylvania State Park are located on the Potomac River and provide swimming, boating, picnic and hiking services. Close by is Rippon Lodge, the oldest house in Prince William County, which is open for tours throughout the summer.  Trails at Leesylvania Park lead to the ancestral home of the Lee family.

History

Woodbridge was initially a village composed largely of plantations and later farms and industrial complexes. Formally dating to at least 1731 when Prince William County was formed out of the Stafford County, Virginia. Initially, the first Prince William County Courthouse was erected in Woodbridge owing to its location halfway between Dumfries, Virginia and Alexandria, Virginia, the two largest Cities which were then in Prince William County. With the incorporation of Fairfax County Woodbridge ceased to be the center of the county and municipal function eventually shifted westward into Brentsville and eventually to Manassas where it is today.

Later, the Woodbridge postal delivery area became the hub that included Dale City and Lake Ridge, which had previously been forged as a planned community in the 1960s and 1970s. The area takes its name from Thomas Mason's 1795 wooden toll bridge built to supplant the existing ferry, carrying the King's Highway traffic across the Occoquan River. Mason's Woodbridge Plantation was located in the area of the present day Belmont Bay golf course community. The original bridge from which the area takes its name was washed away in 1807 following a heavy storm. Subsequently, industrial and economic development shifted toward Occoquan the next nearest river crossing. The bridge would not be replaced until the 20th century when an iron truss bridge was built. This bridge failed in 1972 during Hurricane Agnes and was eventually replaced by the current structure.

The Freestone Point Confederate Battery and Rippon Lodge are listed on the National Register of Historic Places.
Tent city
Since ca. 2003, numerous people have been trespassing in a  tent city adjacent to the Potomac Mills mall. It is tolerated by the private landlord. In 2018, part of the residents were directed to leave.

Geography
Woodbridge is at  (38.643517, −77.260843). It is located on the peninsula of Linton Neck.

The 2010 census reconfigured Woodbridge so that the majority of its land area was redesignated Marumsco and Neabsco, Virginia. The southern border of Woodbridge is now Occoquan Road. The area between Occoquan Road and Opitz Boulevard–Rippon Boulevard is now Marumsco. All of the former Woodbridge CDP south of those streets has been designated as Neabsco. However, these areas continue to have postal addresses in "Woodbridge," which is served by a post office in Marumsco.

Climate
Woodbridge has a humid subtropical climate.

Nearby towns and communities 
 Dale City
 Dumfries
 Lake Ridge
 Lorton
 Montclair
 Occoquan

Demographics

As of the 2020 Census, Woodbridge had 44,668 residents with 13,107 households. The racial demographics were as follows:
 
 42.3% Hispanic or Latino
 23.5% White
 22.2% Black or African American
 8.6% Asian
 8.1% Two or More Races
 0.2% American Indian or Alaska Native
 0.2% Native Hawaiian or Other Pacific Islander

As of the census of 2000, there were 31,941 people, 10,687 households, and 7,769 families residing in the CDP. The racial makeup of the CDP was 56.34% White, 23.45% African American, 0.55% Native American, 4.90% Asian, 0.17% Pacific Islander, 9.62% from other races, and 4.96% from two or more races. Hispanic or Latino people of any race were 19.07% of the population.

There were 10,687 households, out of which 41.5% had children under the age of 18 living with them, 52.3% were married couples living together, 14.2% had a female householder with no husband present, and 27.3% were non-families. Of all households 20.4% were made up of individuals, and 3.9% had someone living alone who was 65 years of age or older. The average household size was 2.96 and the average family size was 3.40.

In the CDP, the population was spread out, with 30.0% under the age of 18, 10.7% from 18 to 24, 35.7% from 25 to 44, 17.0% from 45 to 64, and 6.7% who were 65 years of age or older. The median age was 30 years. For every 100 females, there were 102.5 males. For every 100 females age 18 and over, there were 100.2 males.

The median income for a household in the CDP was $75,525, and the median income for a family was $52,362. Males had a median income of $35,538 versus $28,587 for females. The per capita income for the CDP was $19,810. About 4.6% of families and 5.5% of the population were below the poverty line, including 7.7% of those under age 18 and 5.9% of those age 65 or over.

The estimate median house or condo value was $294,156 as of 2008. As of 2013, the average home sale price was $222,940.

Education

Public schools

The nearby public high schools include:
 Freedom High School
 Gar-Field Senior High School
 Woodbridge High School
 Colgan High School

The middle schools include:
 Fred Lynn Middle School
 Lake Ridge Middle School
 Rippon Middle School
 Woodbridge Middle School

The elementary schools include:
 Antietam Elementary School
 Belmont Elementary School
 Elizabeth Vaughan Elementary School
 Featherstone Elementary School
 Lake Ridge Elementary School
 Marumsco Hills Elementary School
 Occoquan Elementary School
 Potomac View Elementary School
 R. Dean Kilby Elementary School
 River Oaks Elementary School
 Springwoods Elementary School
 West Ridge Elementary School

Private education
Colleges:
 Northern Virginia Community College, Woodbridge Campus
 Stratford University

Private high schools:
 Christ Chapel Academy (Pre–12)
 Heritage Christian School (K–12)
Saint John Paul the Great Catholic High School

Private middle schools, elementary schools, and preschools:
 Academy Day Care (Pre-1)
 Cardinal Montessori School (Pre-4)
 Christ Chapel Academy (Pre-12)
 Cloverdale School (Pre-2)
 Manassas Christian School
 Manassas Christian School Academy
 Minnieland Private Day School (Pre-K)
 Prince William Academy (Pre-8)
 Riverview Baptist Day School (Pre-K)
 Saint Thomas Aquinas Regional School (Pre-8)
 Young World Development Center (Pre-4)

Attractions and culture
Woodbridge experienced its current development boom in the mid-1980s, after being a municipality composed largely of either farms or industrial complexes, as an annex of sorts of Dale City, which had been forged as a planned community in the 1960s and 1970s.

Woodbridge is home to Potomac Mills Mall (managed by Simon Property Group), one of the largest shopping centers in northern Virginia. Woodbridge is a suburban city because many of its residents are employed in nearby Washington, D.C.

Due in part to the I-95 and I-66 HOV waiver given to hybrid vehicles, many D.C. government workers have relocated to the area to take advantage of the lower-priced housing.  However, in July 2006, the hybrid/HOV privilege was revoked.  Vehicles registered prior to July 2006 were exempted from occupancy requirements in all (HOV) facilities in Virginia until July 1, 2009.

Other cultural resources include Rippon Lodge, the oldest house in Prince William County, which was opened as a park and museum in October 2007.

Sports

Woodbridge was the former home of the Potomac Nationals minor league baseball club, before their relocation to Fredericksburg. Their former stadium, the Pfitzner Stadium, is located in Woodbridge. The stadium is now the source of many community events.

On May 24, 2022, the Washington Commanders announced plans for a new stadium complex in Woodbridge, with plans for a new stadium, amphitheater, retail hub, and office space.

Transportation

Highways

Passing north—south through Woodbridge is U.S. Route 1, with Interstate 95, which forms the western boundary of the CDP, running parallel to it further west. Three other major routes, all of which have interchanges with I-95 and terminate at U.S. 1, are VA 123 (Gordon Boulevard)—which heads north to Fairfax and ends in Arlington at the Washington, D.C. border, VA 294 (Prince William Parkway)—which heads northeast to and ends in the Manassas area, and SR 784 (Dale Boulevard)—which heads northeast to Dale City and ends west of Hoadly. Other major roads in Woodbridge include SR 639 (Horner Road), SR 906 (Occoquan Road), and SR 2000 (Opitz Boulevard).

Public transportation
The Potomac and Rappahannock Transportation Commission (PRTC), which operates its OmniRide and OmniRide Local bus services throughout Prince William County, is headquartered in Woodbridge. Two routes operate in Woodbridge; the Woodbridge/Lake Ridge (WOODLOC) route—serving the two communities of Woodbridge and Lake Ridge, and the Route 1 (RT1LOC) route, which runs from the Woodbridge train station down to Quantico.

Woodbridge station, at 1040 Express Way, is owned by Virginia Railway Express (VRE) and serves Amtrak's Northeast Regional line and VRE's Fredericksburg Line. The train station receives bus service from the OmniRide Woodbridge/Lake Ridge and Route 1 routes.

Notable people
 Jeff Baker, 10-year Major League Baseball player
 Brandon Brown, NASCAR driver
 Russell Davis, former NFL running back
 Benita Fitzgerald (Olympic Gold Medalist - 100m hurdles)
 Christine Fox, former Acting US Deputy Secretary of Defense
 Da'Shawn Hand, defensive tackle for the Detroit Lions
 Emmylou Harris, (singer, songwriter, musician); Member, Country Music Hall of Fame 
 Meyers Leonard, NBA basketball player
 Nelson Martinez, soccer player
 David Robinson, Basketball Hall of Fame player
 Tony Lilly NFL Player

See also
 Belmont Bay, Woodbridge
 List of people from the Washington, D.C. metropolitan area

References

External links

 Prince William County Government
 North Woodbridge Future Looks Bright – May 18, 2010 Prince William County Press Release
 

 
Census-designated places in Prince William County, Virginia
Census-designated places in Virginia
Unincorporated communities in Virginia
Washington metropolitan area